Dendrothereua is a genus of house centipedes in the family Scutigeridae. There are at least three described species in Dendrothereua, found in the southern United States and the Neotropics.

Dendrothereua was formerly considered a taxonomic synonym of Scutigera. In 2009, Edgecomb and Giribet resurrected the genus based on Phylogenetic research. The species of Dendrothereua are still sometimes considered part of Scutigera.

Species
These three species belong to the genus Dendrothereua:
 Dendrothereua homa (Chamberlin, 1942) i b (Arizona house centipede)
 Dendrothereua linceci (Wood, 1867) i
 Dendrothereua nubila (Chamberlin, 1921) i
Data sources: i = ITIS, c = Catalogue of Life, g = GBIF, b = Bugguide.net

References

Further reading

External links

 

Scutigeromorpha